John Frederick Lindow (born July 23, 1946) is an American philologist who is Professor Emeritus of Old Norse and Folklore at University of California, Berkeley. He is a well known authority on Old Norse religion and literature.

Biography
John Lindow was born in Washington, D.C. on July 23, 1946, the son of Wesley Lindow and Eleanor Niemetta. His father was a banker and his mother was a teacher.

John Lindow received his undergraduate degree at Harvard University, where he gained a A.B. magna cum laude in 1968, and a PhD in 1972, both in Germanic Languages and Literatures. 

After gaining his Ph.D, Lindow joined the faculty at University of California, Berkeley, serving as Acting Assistant Professor (1972-1974), Assistant Professor (1974-1977), Associate Professor (1977-1983), and Professor of Scandinavian (1983-?). He was since retired as Professor Emeritus of Old Norse and Folklore.

In 1977, Lindow was elected as a corresponding member of the Royal Gustavus Adolphus Academy. In 2018, he received the Knight's Cross of the Order of the Falcon at the Icelandic president's residence for scholarly contributions in the area of Icelandic medieval literature. He is also a member of the  American Folklore Society, the Medieval Academy of America and the Society for the Advancement of Scandinavian Study.

Research
Lindow specializes in the study of Old Norse religion and literature. He is also an expert on Scandinavian folklore, Sami and Finnish mythology, and Inuit religion. Lindow's Handbook of Norse mythology was published in 2001. He is the co-editor of the forthcoming Pre-Christian Religions of the North: History and Structures, which is to be published in four volumes by Brepols, and the forthcoming Old Norse Mythology, which is to be published by Oxford University Press.

Personal life
Lindow married Katharine Forbes, a teacher, on October 4, 1968, with whom he has two daughters.

Selected publications
 Lindow, John (1976) Comitatus, individual and honor: Studies in north Germanic institutional vocabulary, University of California Press
 Lindow, John (1978) Swedish legends and folktales, Berkeley: University of California Press
 Myths and Legends of the Vikings, Bellerophon Books, 1980.
 Viking Ships, Belerophon Books, 1982.
 Scandinavian Mythology: An Annotated Bibliography, Garland Press, 1984.
 (Editor with Carol J. Clover) Old Norse-Icelandic Literature: A Critical Guide, Cornell University Press (Ithaca, NY), 1985, University of Toronto Press (Toronto, Ontario, Canada), 2005.
 (Editor with Lars Lonnroth and Gerd Wolfgang Weber) Structure and Meaning in Old Norse Literature: New Approaches to Textual Analysis and Literary Criticism, Odense University Press (Odense), 1986.
 Lindow, John (1997) Murder Vengeance among the Gods: Baldr in Scandinavian Mythology, Helsinki : Suomalainen tiedeakatemia, Academia Scientiarum Fennica
 (Editor with Carl Lindahl and John McNamara) Medieval Folklore: An Encyclopedia of Myths, Legends, Tales, Beliefs, and Customs, ABC-CLIO, 2000.
 Lindow, John (2001) Handbook of Norse mythology, Santa Barbara, Calif. also published as Lindow, John (2001). Norse Mythology: A Guide to the Gods, Heroes, Rituals, and Beliefs. Oxford University Press. .
 Lindow, John (2014) Trolls: An Unnatural History. London: Reaction Books

See also
 Rudolf Simek
 Gabriel Turville-Petre
 Hilda Ellis Davidson
 Georges Dumézil
 Edgar C. Polomé
 Andy Orchard

References

Sources

External links 
 University of California: Berkeley: John Lindow (Accessed Jan 2011)

1946 births
Living people
American folklorists
American philologists
Fellows of the Medieval Academy of America
Germanic studies scholars
Harvard University alumni
Knights of the Order of the Falcon
Old Norse studies scholars
People from Washington, D.C.
Society for the Advancement of Scandinavian Study
Writers on Germanic paganism
University of California, Berkeley College of Letters and Science faculty